The following outline is provided as an overview of and topical guide to Christian theology:

Christian theology is the study of Christian belief and practice. Such study concentrates primarily upon the texts of the Old Testament and the New Testament as well as on Christian tradition. Christian theologians use biblical exegesis, rational analysis, and argument. Theology might be undertaken to help the theologian better understand Christian tenets, to make comparisons between Christianity and other traditions, to defend Christianity against objections and criticism, to facilitate reforms in the Christian church, and to assist in the propagation of Christianity.

Divisions of Christian theology, 
There are many methods of categorizing different approaches to Christian theology.  For a historical analysis, see the main article on the History of Christian theology.

Sub-disciplines 

Christian theologians may be specialists in one or more theological sub-disciplines. These sub-disciplines are often included in certain job titles such as 'Professor of x', 'Senior Lecturer in y':

 Apologetics/polemics – studying Christian theology as it compares to non-Christian worldviews in order to defend the faith and challenge beliefs that lie in contrast with Christianity.
 Biblical hermeneutics – interpretation of the Bible, often with particular emphasis on the nature and constraints of contemporary interpretation. Hermeneutics takes into consideration  the culture at the time of writing, who wrote the text, who was the text written for, etc.
 Biblical studies – interpretation of the Bible, often with particular emphasis on historical-critical investigation.
 Biblical theology – interpretation of the Bible, often with particular emphasis on links between biblical texts and the topics of systematic or dogmatic theology.
 Constructive theology – generally another name for systematic theology; also specifically a postmodernist approach to systematic theology, applying (among other things) feminist theory, queer theory, deconstructionism, and hermeneutics to theological topics.
 Dogmatic theology – studying theology (or dogma) as it developed in different church denominations.
 Ecumenical theology – comparing the doctrines of the diverse churches (e.g., Eastern Orthodox, Roman Catholic, the various Protestant denominations) with the goal of promoting unity among them
 Exegesis – interpretation of the Bible.
 Historical theology – studying Christian theology via the thoughts of other Christians throughout the centuries.
 Homiletics – in theology the application of general principles of rhetoric to public preaching.
 Moral theology, specifically Christian ethics – explores the moral and ethical dimensions of the religious life
 Natural theology – the discussion of those aspects of theology that can be investigated without the help of revelation scriptures or tradition (sometimes contrasted with "positive theology").
 Patristics or patrology—studies the teaching of Church Fathers, or the development of Christian ideas and practice in the period of the Church Fathers.
 Philosophical theology – the use of philosophical methods in developing or analyzing theological concepts.
 Pragmatic or practical theology – studying theology as it relates to everyday living and service to God, including serving as a religious minister.
 Spiritual theology—studying theology as a means to orthopraxy; scripture and tradition are both used as guides for spiritual growth and discipline.
 Systematic theology (doctrinal theology, dogmatic theology or philosophical theology)—focused on the attempt to arrange and interpret the ideas current in the religion. This is also associated with constructive theology.
 Theological aesthetics – interdisciplinary study of theology and aesthetics/the arts.
 Theological hermeneutics – the study of the manner of construction of theological formulations. Related to theological methodology.

Major topics 

These topics crop up repeatedly in Christian theology; composing the main recurrent 'loci' around which Christian theological discussion revolves.

 Bible – the nature and means of its inspiration, etc.; including hermeneutics (the development and study of theories of the interpretation and understanding of texts and the topic of Biblical law in Christianity)
 Eschatology – the study of the last things, or end times. Covers subjects such as death and the afterlife, the end of history, the end of the world, the last judgment, the nature of hope and progress, etc.
 Christology – the study of Jesus Christ, of his nature(s), and of the relationship between his divinity and humanity;
 Divine providence – the study of sovereignty, superintendence, or agency of God over events in people's lives and throughout history.
 Ecclesiology (sometimes a subsection of missiology)—the study of the Christian Church, including the institutional structure, sacraments and practices (especially the worship of God) thereof
 Mariology – area of theology concerned with Mary, the Mother of Jesus Christ.
 Missiology (sometimes a subsection of ecclesiology)—God's will in the world, missions, evangelism, etc.
 Pneumatology – the study of the Holy Spirit, sometimes also 'geist' as in Hegelianism and other philosophico-theological systems
 Protology - the study of first things, such as God's creation of the universe.
 Soteriology – the study of the nature and means of salvation. May include hamartiology (the study of sin), God's Law and the Gospel (the study of the relationship between the Divine Law and divine grace, justification, and sanctification.)
 Theological anthropology – the study of humanity, especially as it relates to the divine.
 Theology proper – the study of God's attributes, nature, and relation to the world. May include:
 Theodicy – attempts at reconciling the existence of evil and suffering in the world with the nature and justice of God.
 Apophatic theology – negative theology which seeks to describe God by negation (e.g., immutable, impassible ). It is the discussion of what God is not, or the investigation of how language about God breaks down. Apophatic theology often is contrasted with "Cataphatic theology".

A traditional pattern 

In many Christian seminaries, the four Great Departments of Theology are:

 Exegetical theology
 Historical theology
 Systematic theology
 Practical theology

The four departments can usefully be subdivided in the following way:
1. Exegetical theology:
 Biblical studies (analysis of the contents of Scripture)
 Biblical introduction
 Canonics (inquiry into how the different books of the Bible came to be collected together)
 Biblical theology (inquiry into how divine revelation progressed over the course of the Bible).

2. Historical theology (study of how Christian theology develops over time):

 The Patristic Period (1st through 8th centuries)
 The Ante-Nicene Fathers (1st to 3rd centuries)
 The Nicene Fathers (4th century)
 The Post-Nicene Fathers (5th to 8th centuries)
 The Middle Ages (8th to 16th centuries)
 The Reformation and Counter-Reformation (16th to 18th centuries)
 The Modern Period (18th to 21st centuries)

3. Systematic theology:

 Prolegomena (first principles)
 Theology Proper
 The existence of God
 The attributes of God
 The Trinity
 Creation
 Divine Providence
 Doctrine of Man (theological anthropology)
 Christology
 Soteriology
 Justification
 Sanctification
 Pneumatology (doctrine of the Holy Spirit)
 Ecclesiology (doctrine of the Church)
 Eschatology and the afterlife.

4. Practical theology:

 Moral theology (Christian ethics and casuistry)
 Ecclesiology
 Pastoral theology
 Liturgics
 Homiletics
 Christian education
 Christian counseling
 Missiology

Roman Catholic theology 

One important branch of Christian theology is Roman Catholic theology which has these major teachings:

 Biblical canon (involvement of Pope Damasus I [b.305]);
 Absolution (sacerdotal remittance of sin);
 The apostolic succession (i.e., of bishops and the Pope from the original Apostles);
 Christology;
 Ecclesiology since Vatican II;
 Infant Baptism;
 Ecumenism (the move to reunite churches);
 Ecumenical Councils (as means to bring about change or reform);
 Icon veneration;
 The Immaculate Conception of Mary;
 Real Presence;
 Liturgy since Vatican II;
  Models of the Church (Avery Dulles);
 Moral Theology/Ethics;
 Natural Law;
 Indulgences (i.e., remissions by the Church of some penalties for sin);
 Mary (Mary as Theotokos [i.e., in Greek, "God-bearer" or "Mother of God"]; as perpetually virgin; the Assumption of Mary);
 The Pope (i.e., belief that the Pope is the successor of St. Peter, the "rock" on which the Church is built, and therefore the infallible head of Christendom);
 Purgatory (a "holding place" after death where souls are purified before entering heaven);
 Sacerdotalism (priesthood as intermediary and sacred office; also see priesthood (Catholic Church), Mass (liturgy), and priesthood in Vatican II);
 The Sacraments; Transubstantiation; Fermentum;
 Sainthood, canonization and beatification;
 Papal Infallibility (the Pope being infallible when he speaks ex cathedra, that is, when he speaks in his magisterial capacity to the whole Church on a matter of faith or morals);
 Tradition (i.e., its authority relative to Scripture and role of Tradition in Church Councils).

Controversial movements 

Christians have had theological disagreements since the time of Jesus. Theological disputes have given rise to many schisms and different Christian denominations, sects and movements.

Pre-Reformation 

 Alogi –  rejected the doctrine of the Logos
 Arianism –  doctrines regarding Christ's divinity;
 Donatism
 Ebionitism
 Gnosticism –  Generally rejected the goodness of the physical to emphasize the spiritual, also emphasized "hidden teachings."
 Judaizers
 Manichaeism
 Marcionism
 Monarchianism –  doctrines regarding Christ's divinity
 Monophysitism –  doctrines regarding Christ's divinity
 Montanism
 Nazarene (sect)
 Nicolationism
 Nontrinitarianism
 Novatianism
 Pelagianism –  denial of original sin and helplessness of sinner to save himself, strong affirmation of libertarian free will (see also Semi-Pelagianism)
 Quartodecimanism –  Easter controversy
 Sabellianism –  doctrines regarding the Trinity, also known as "modalism."
 Simonianism

Post-Reformation 

Because the Reformation promoted the idea that Christians could expound their own views of theology based on the notion of "sola scriptura," the Bible alone, many theological distinctions have occurred between the various Protestant denominations.  The differences between many of the denominations are relatively minor; however, and this has helped ecumenical efforts in recent times.

 Adventism –  Typified by the Seventh-day Adventist Church.
 Anabaptism
 Anglicanism
 Anglo-Catholicism –  High church theology of Anglicanism.
 Arminianism –  affirms man's freedom to accept or reject God's gift of salvation; identified with Dutch Reformed theologian Jacobus Arminius, developed by Hugo Grotius, defended by the Remonstrants, and popularized by John Wesley. Key doctrine of Methodist churches, adopted by many Baptists and some Congregationalists.
 Brethrenism: Anabaptist-Pietist, with Open and Exclusive streams.
 Calvinism –  System of soteriology advanced by French Reformer John Calvin, which espouses Augustinian views on election and reprobation; stresses absolute predestination, the sovereignty of God and the inability of man to effect his own salvation by believing the Gospel prior to regeneration; principle doctrines are often summarized by the acronym TULIP (see Canons of Dort).
 Charismaticism –  Movement in many Protestant and some Catholic churches that emphasizes the gifts of the Spirit and the continual working of the Holy Spirit within the body of Christ; often associated with glossolalia (i.e., speaking in tongues) and divine healing.
 Congregationalism –  Form of governance used in Congregationalist, Baptist, and Pentecostal churches in which each congregation is self-governing and independent of all others.
 Counter-Reformation (or Catholic Reformation): The Roman Catholic response to the Protestant Reformation (see also Council of Trent).
 Creation Spirituality –  Panentheist theology.
 Deism – The general doctrine that no faith is necessary for justified belief in God's existence or the doctrine that God does not intervene in earthly affairs (contrasts with Fideism).
 Dispensationalism –  Belief in a conservative, Biblically literalist hermeneutic and philosophy of history that, by stressing the dichotomy between Israel and the Church, rejects supersessionism (commonly referred to as "replacement theology").
 Evangelicalism –  Typically conservative, predominantly Protestant outlook that prioritizes evangelism above all or most other activities of the Church (see also neo-evangelicalism).
Fideism –  The doctrine that faith is irrational, that God's existence transcends logic, and that all knowledge of God is on the basis of faith (contrasts with Deism).
 Latitudinarianism: Broad church theology of Anglicanism.
 Liberalism –  Belief in interpreting the Bible to allow for the maximum amount of individual freedom.
 Low church –  Puritanical / Evangelical theology of Anglicanism.
 Methodism –  Form of church governance and doctrine used in the Methodist Church.
 Modernism –  Belief that truth changes, so doctrine must evolve in light of new information or trends.
 Latter Day Saint movement (Mormonism): Belief that the Book of Mormon and others to be additional divine scriptures; belief in living prophets; generally reject the Nicene creed and other early creeds.
 New Thought –  Movement based on 19th century New England belief in positive thinking. Several denominations arose from it including Unity Church, and Religious Science.
 Nonconformism –  Advocacy of religious liberty; includes Quakers, Methodists, Baptists, Congregationalists and Salvationists.
 Nontrinitarianism –  Rejection of the doctrine of Trinity.
 Open Theism –  A rejection of the exhaustive foreknowledge of God, by attributing it to Greek philosophy.
 Pentecostalism
 Pietism –  A stream of Lutheranism placing renewed emphasis on the Bible and a universal priesthood of all believers.
 Presbyterianism –  Form of governance used in Presbyterian and Reformed churches.
 Puritanism: Movement to cleanse Episcopalianism of any "ritualistic" aspects.
 Supersessionism –  Belief that the Christian Church, the body of Christ, is the only elect people of God in the new covenant age (see also covenant theology).
 Restoration Movement –  19th century attempt to return to a New Testament model of the Church.
 Restorationism (Christian primitivism) –  The doctrine that most of the modern Church is apostate; includes the Millerites, Seventh-day Adventists, Jehovah's Witnesses, and Latter Day Saints.
 Salvation Army –  An offshoot of the Methodist Church known for its charitable activities
 Tractarianism –  Oxford Movement. It led to Anglo-Catholicism.
 Ultramontanism –  A movement within 19th-century Roman Catholicism to emphasize papal authority, particularly in the wake of the French Revolution and the secularization of the state
 Unification Church
 Unitarianism –  Rejects a holy "Trinity" and also the divinity of Christ, with some exceptions (see modalism).
 Universalism –  In various forms, the belief that all people will ultimately be reconciled with God; most famously defended by Origen.
 Alger Park Christian Reformed Church https://www.algerparkchurch.org/

Contemporary theological movements 

In addition to the movements listed above, the following are some of the movements found amongst Christian theologians:

 Augustinianism
 Black theology
 Catholic Christianity
 Anarchism
 Christian fundamentalism
 Covenant Theology
 Dalit theology (a form of liberation theology developed in India)
 Dispensationalism
 Eastern Orthodox Christianity
 Emerging church
 Evangelicalism
 Feminist theology
 Fundamentalism
 Holocaust theology (In response to the horrors of the Holocaust especially in relation to Theodicy)
 Liberal theology
 Liberation theology
 Lutheranism
 Methodism
 Molinism
 Narrative theology – studying a narrative presentation of the faith rather than dogmatic development.
 Neo-orthodoxy (also known as "dialectical theology" and "crisis theology", stemming from the works of Søren Kierkegaard and Karl Barth)
 Neo-scholasticism
 New Church
 New Covenant Theology
 Palamism
 Paleo-Orthodoxy
 Pentecostalism
 Personalism
 Postliberal theology
 Postmodern theology
 Process theology
 Progressive theology
 Prosperity theology
 Queer Theology
 Quakerism
 Restoration Movement
 Revisionist theology
 Scotism
 Thomism
 Transcendental Theology

Christian theology organizations

Evangelical Theological Society (ETS) 
ETS is a professional, academic society of Biblical scholars, teachers, pastors, students, and others involved in evangelical scholarship.

International Academy of Practical Theology (IAPT) 
The purpose of the International Academy of Practical Theology is the study of and critical reflection on practical theological thought and action. This critical reflection should be pursued with attention to the various historical and cultural contexts in which practical theology is done. Out of respect for the diversity of these contexts, the academy seeks to promote international, interracial, and ecumenical dialogue and understanding.

Notes

See also 

 Biblical canon
 Eastern Orthodox – Roman Catholic theological differences
 Eastern Orthodox – Roman Catholic ecclesiastical differences
 Christian ecumenism
 Christian worship
 Ecumenism
 Heresy
 List of Christian theologians
 List of Methodist theologians
 Protestant Reformation
 Roman Catholicism
 Vatican II
 Theology
 Wesleyan Quadrilateral
 Word of Faith

References 

 Andcone, J.H., eds. Black Theology; A Documentary History, 1966–1979. Orbis Books, 1979
 Appiah-Kubi, K and Torres, S., eds. African Theology en Route, Orbis Books, 1979
 Bonino, J.M. Doing theology in a Revolutionary situation, Philadelphia:Fortress Press, 1975.
 Christian Theology Reader by Alister McGrath. 
 Christian Theology: An Introduction by Alister McGrath. 
 Elwood, D.J., ed. Asian Christian Theology; Emerging Themes. Philadelphia: Westminster Press, 1979
 Fuller, Reginald H. The Foundations of New Testament Christology (1965). 
 Gonzalez, Justo L. The Story of Christianity (1984, 1985, 1999). )
 Hill, Jonathan 2003) The History of Christian Thought.  and 0830827765
 Hoare, Ryan, 2009,'What is Theology' A lecture Given at suburbschurch Bristol.
 Koyama, Kosuke, Waterbuffalo Theology. Orbis books, 1974
 Leith, John H. Introduction to the Reformed Tradition (1978). )
 Miranda, J. Being and the Messiah. Orbis Books, 1974.
 Moore, B., ed. The Challenge of Black Theology in South Africa. Atlanta: John Knox Press, 1974.
 Muzorewa, H. African Theology: Its Origin and Development. Orbis Books, 1984.
 Sobrino, J. Christology on the Crossroads. Orbis Books, 1978
 Systematic Theology, an ecumenical trilogy by Thomas Oden
 Volume 1: The Living God (1992). 
 Volume 2: The Word of Life (1992). 
 Volume 3: Life in the Spirit (1994).

External links 

 Confident Christians Free Christian apologetic materials and presentations
 Christian Theology Reading Room: Extensive online resources for theology (Tyndale Seminary)
 Christian Socialist Party USA: Real time modern day Christian theology.

andsigma;
Christian theology
Christian theology
Theology, Outline of Christian